The min-entropy, in information theory, is the smallest of the Rényi family of entropies, corresponding to the most conservative way of measuring the unpredictability of a set of outcomes, as the negative logarithm of the probability of the most likely outcome.  The various Rényi entropies are all equal for a uniform distribution, but measure the unpredictability of a nonuniform distribution in different ways.  The min-entropy is never greater than the ordinary or Shannon entropy (which measures the average unpredictability of the outcomes) and that in turn is never greater than the Hartley or max-entropy, defined as the logarithm of the number of outcomes with nonzero probability.

As with the classical Shannon entropy and its quantum generalization, the von Neumann entropy, one can define a conditional version of min-entropy.  The conditional quantum min-entropy is a one-shot, or conservative, analog of conditional quantum entropy.

To interpret a conditional information measure, suppose Alice and Bob were to share a bipartite quantum state . Alice has access to system  and Bob to system . The conditional entropy measures the average uncertainty Bob has about Alice's state upon sampling from his own system. The min-entropy can be interpreted as the distance of a state from a maximally entangled state.

This concept is useful in quantum cryptography, in the context of privacy amplification (See for example ).

Definitions 

Definition: Let  be a bipartite density operator on the space .

where the infimum ranges over all density operators  on the space . The measure  is the maximum relative entropy defined as

The smooth min-entropy is defined in terms of the min-entropy.

This measure of -close is defined in terms of the purified distance

where  is the fidelity measure.

These quantities can be seen as generalizations of the von Neumann entropy. Indeed, the von Neumann entropy can be expressed as

This is called the fully quantum asymptotic equipartition theorem.
The smoothed entropies share many interesting properties with the von Neumann entropy. For example, the smooth min-entropy satisfy a data-processing inequality:

Operational interpretation of smoothed min-entropy 

Henceforth, we shall drop the subscript  from the min-entropy when it is obvious from the context on what state it is evaluated.

Min-entropy as uncertainty about classical information 
Suppose an agent had access to a quantum system  whose state  depends on some classical variable . Furthermore, suppose that each of its elements  is distributed according to some distribution . This can be described by the following state over the system .

where  form an orthonormal basis. We would like to know what the agent can learn about the classical variable . Let  be the probability that the agent guesses  when using an optimal measurement strategy

where  is the POVM that maximizes this expression. It can be shown that this optimum can be expressed in terms of the min-entropy as

In this case, it turns out that

Min-entropy as distance from maximally entangled state 

The maximally entangled state  on a bipartite system  is defined as

where  and  form an orthonormal basis for the spaces  and  respectively.
For a bipartite quantum state , we define the maximum overlap with the maximally entangled state as

This is a measure of how correlated the state  is. It can be shown that .

Proof of operational characterization of min-entropy 

The proof is from a paper by König, Schaffner, Renner in 2008. It involves the machinery of semidefinite programs. Suppose we are given some bipartite density operator . From the definition of the min-entropy, we have

This can be re-written as

subject to the conditions

We notice that the infimum is taken over compact sets and hence can be replaced by a minimum. This can then be expressed succinctly as a semidefinite program. Consider the primal problem

We can express the dual problem as a maximization over operators  on the space  as

Using the Choi–Jamiołkowski isomorphism, we can define the channel  such that

where the bell state is defined over the space . This means that we can express the objective function of the dual problem as

as desired.

Notice that in the event that the system  is a partly classical state as above, then the quantity that we are after reduces to

We can interpret  as a guessing strategy and this then reduces to the interpretation given above where an adversary wants to find the string  given access to quantum information via system .

See also
 von Neumann entropy
 Generalized relative entropy
 max-entropy

References

Quantum mechanical entropy